National Route 417 is a national highway of Japan connecting Ōgaki, Gifu and Minamiechizen, Fukui in Japan, with a total length of 143 km (88.86 mi).

References

National highways in Japan
Roads in Fukui Prefecture
Roads in Gifu Prefecture